Zima may refer to:

 Zima (drink), an alcoholic beverage
 Zima (town), a town in Russia
 Zima (surname)
 Zima Blue and Other Stories, a collection of short works by Alastair Reynolds
 Zima, a character in the anime series Chobits
 ZIMA, Zimbabwe Music Awards

See also
 
 
 Zim (disambiguation)